Dolní Morava is a municipality and village in Ústí nad Orlicí District in the Pardubice Region of the Czech Republic. It has about 400 inhabitants.

Administrative parts
Villages of Horní Morava and Velká Morava are administrative parts of Dolní Morava.

Geography
Most of the municipality lies in the Snieznik Mountains.

The Morava river, which gave the name to the villages in the municipality, springs on Králický Sněžník. It flows across the municipality and forms here the historic boundary between Bohemia and Moravia.

History
The area around the Morava River was settled during the second half of the 16th century. The first written mention of Morava is from 1577, Velká Morava was first mentioned in 1564. Before 1720, it was split into two separate villages of Dolní Morava and Horní Morava, administered as parts of the Králíky estate. In 1850, the villages became three independent municipalities.

Historically, the territory was inhabited mainly by ethnic Germans. After the World War II, they were expelled and partially replaced by Czech settlers. In 1960, Dolní Morava, Horní Morava and Velká Morava were merged into one municipality.

Sights
Sky Bridge 721, the longest suspension footbridge in the world, is located here.

The Church of Saint Aloysius Gonzaga was built in the Empire style in 1801, the rectory dates from 1802.

References

External links

Villages in Ústí nad Orlicí District